Peruanus serricornis is a species of beetle in the family Cerambycidae, the only species in the genus Peruanus.

References

Cerambycini